Nagarbera is a village in Kamrup district. It is on south bank of river Brahmaputra and is 90.6 km from Guwahati city.

Nearby areas.
Dhupdhara,boko.
Nearby city.
Guwahati.

Transport
Nagarbera is accessible through National Highway 37. It is well connected with Guwahati and other major nearby towns with private commercial vehicles.

See also
 Guwakuchi
 Dimu Dobak

References

Villages in Kamrup district